Manuel "Manolo" Echezarreta Tellechea (4 October 1915 — 17 October 1980) was a Spanish football player and manager.

External links

1915 births
1980 deaths
Sportspeople from Irun
Spanish footballers
Footballers from the Basque Country (autonomous community)
Association football midfielders
Segunda División players
Real Unión footballers
CA Osasuna players
Deportivo Alavés players
Spanish football managers
La Liga managers
Segunda División managers
Deportivo Alavés managers
CD Málaga managers
Hércules CF managers
CE Sabadell FC managers
CD Logroñés managers
Real Unión managers